The year 1817 in archaeology involved some significant events.

Events
The Elgin Marbles go on display in the British Museum in London.
Stamford Raffles publishes The History of Java.

Explorations
 Giovanni Battista Belzoni travels extensively through Egypt, visiting Abu Simbel, Karnak and the Valley of the Kings, creating several excavation sites.
 Major Stephen H. Long commands an expedition exploring the southern part of Arkansas, as well as the Louisiana border of the Red River; he also explores the Wisconsin River to its headwaters and the Mississippi River to the Falls of Saint Anthony.

Excavations

 October - The KV16 burial site of Ramesses I in the East Valley of the Kings is discovered and excavated by Giovanni Battista Belzoni.
 Near Cairo, the Great Sphinx of Giza is excavated to chest level by Giovanni Battista Caviglia.
 Giovanni Battista Belzoni clears the Great Temple of Abu Simbel of sand.
 The tophet in Carthage is first excavated; since then, hundreds of urns and stelae (engraved stones) have been recovered.

Finds
 January 1 - Sailing through the Sandwich Islands, Otto von Kotzebue discovers New Year Island.
 October - Giovanni Battista Belzoni finds the tomb and sarcophagus of Seti I.
 October 9 - The KV21 burial site in the Valley of the Kings is discovered by Giovanni Battista Belzoni.
 October 10 - The KV16 burial site of Ramesses I in the East Valley of the Kings is discovered by Giovanni Battista Belzoni.
 November 22 - Frédéric Cailliaud discovers the old Roman emerald mines at Sikait, Egypt.

Births
 Henry Syer Cuming, antiquarian, collector and secretary of the British Archaeological Association (d. 1902)
 March 5 - Austen Henry Layard, French-born British archaeologist of Iran (d. 1894)

Deaths
 November 5 - Carl Haller von Hallerstein, German archaeologist of Greece (b. 1774)

References

Archaeology
Archaeology by year
Archaeology
Archaeology